Myristica andamanica is a species of plant in the family Myristicaceae. It is endemic to the Andaman and Nicobar Islands.
Recent studies by Waman and Bohra (2020) suggested that the seeds can regenerate on their own if they remain undisturbed in soil and favourable microclimatic conditions are available. However, to ensure regular production of seedlings, assisted regeneration was recommended. Retention of seed hull and use of sinking seeds gives high germination percentage. Soaking of seeds in water for 24 h prior to sowing improved germination.

References

 Waman AA and Bohra P (2020) Assisted regeneration for mass multiplication and conservation of vulnerable Myristica andamanica Hook f. from Bay Islands, India. Genetic Resources and Crop Evolution, 67:1707-1713. https://doi.org/10.1007/s10722-020-00963-y

andamanica
Flora of the Andaman Islands
Flora of the Nicobar Islands
Vulnerable plants
Taxonomy articles created by Polbot